Bulgan is a sum (district) of Ömnögovi Province in southern Mongolia. As of 2009, its population is 2,395.

References 

Districts of Ömnögovi Province